Phú Vang is a rural district of Thừa Thiên Huế province in the North Central Coast region of Vietnam. As of 2020 the district had a population of 137,962. The district covers an area of 235.39 km². The district capital lies at Phú Đa.

Administrative divisions
The district contains the township of Phú Đa and 13 communes: 

Phú Xuân
Phú Mỹ
Phú An
Phú Hồ
Phú Hải
Phú Thuận
Phú Diên
Phú Lương
Vinh Xuân
Vinh Thanh
Vinh An
Phú Gia
Vinh Hà

References

Districts of Thừa Thiên Huế province